Bruno Cavelti (born 21 January 1961) is a Swiss gymnast. He competed at the 1984 Summer Olympics and the 1988 Summer Olympics.

References

External links
 

1961 births
Living people
Swiss male artistic gymnasts
Olympic gymnasts of Switzerland
Gymnasts at the 1984 Summer Olympics
Gymnasts at the 1988 Summer Olympics
Place of birth missing (living people)
20th-century Swiss people